The 2024 Women's European Water Polo Championship will be the 20th running of the tournament. It will be held in Tel Aviv, Israel in January 2024.

Qualification

Twelve teams will be able to compete at the main event. They are broken up as follows:

 The host nation
 The top five teams from the 2022 European Championship not already qualified as host nation
 Final six from the qualifiers.

References

Women
Women's European Water Polo Championship
International sports competitions hosted by Israel
Women's European Water Polo Championship
European Water Polo Championship
European Water Polo Championship